The following is a list of Butler Bulldogs men's basketball head coaches. There have been 24 head coaches of the Bulldogs in their 125-season history.

Butler's current head coach is Thad Matta, in his second stint as head coach. He was hired in April 2022 to replace LaVall Jordan, who was fired after the 2021–22 season.

References

Butler

Butler Bulldogs men's basketball coaches